The Sanremo Music Festival 1993 was the 43rd annual Sanremo Music Festival, held at the Teatro Ariston in Sanremo, province of Imperia between 23 and 27 February 1993 and broadcast by Rai 1.

The show was presented by Pippo Baudo and Lorella Cuccarini.

The winner of the Big Artists section was Enrico Ruggeri with the rock-pop song "Mistero", while Cristiano De André ranked second and won the Critics Award with the ballad "Dietro la porta". Laura Pausini won the Newcomers section with the song "La solitudine".

After every night Rai 1 broadcast DopoFestival,  a talk show about the Festival with the participation of singers and  journalists. It was hosted by Alba Parietti  and Pippo Baudo with Giancarlo Magalli, Marta Marzotto and Roberto D'Agostino. The theme song of the talk show was "Papà" by Mino Reitano and Gianni Ippoliti.

Participants and results

Big Artists

Newcomers

References 

Sanremo Music Festival by year
1993 in Italian music 
1993 in Italian television 
1993 music festivals